Takis Pantelis (born 18 May 1955) is a retired Greek football goalkeeper.

References

1955 births
Living people
Apollon Smyrnis F.C. players
PAOK FC players
Panionios F.C. players
Super League Greece players
Greece international footballers
Association football goalkeepers
Kallithea F.C. managers
Greek football managers
Footballers from Athens
Greek footballers